Coordinating Ministry for Maritime and Investment Affairs is the Indonesian government ministry in charge of planning, coordinating as well as synchronizing policies in maritime affairs. The Coordinating Minister for Maritime and Investment Affairs is Luhut Binsar Pandjaitan.

Portfolio and function
After his inauguration, President Joko Widodo announced his new cabinet, "Kabinet Indonesia Maju" on October 23, 2019. There are some nomenclature changes for some ministries including the Coordinating Ministry for Maritime Affairs. It becomes The Coordinating Ministry for Maritime and Investment Affairs. Previously, as stipulated in the Presidential Regulation No. 10 of 2015  The coordinating Ministry for Maritime and Affairs has the following functions:  
 Coordinates and synchronises the formulation, establishment and implementation of ministries policies in maritime affairs.
 Controls ministries' policies implementation in maritime affairs.
 Coordinates the implementation of the task, development, and provides administrative support to all elements of the organisation within the Coordinating Ministry for Maritime Affairs.
 Coordinates and synchronises maritime state resilience development and maritime resources management.
 Coordinates maritime infrastructure development policies.
 Manages the state wealth under the responsibility of the Coordinating Ministry for Maritime Affairs.
 Supervises duties deliver in the Coordinating Ministry for Maritime Affairs.
 Delivers special tasks given by the President

Coordinated ministries
Coordinated ministries in Coordinating Ministry for Maritime Affairs are 
 Transportation
 Maritime Affairs and Fisheries
 Tourism
 Energy and Mineral Resources

Minister

References

Government of Indonesia